Borrowash  is a village in the Erewash district of Derbyshire, England, situated immediately east of the Derby city boundary. The appropriate civil parish is called Ockbrook and Borrowash.

History
Borrowash was, for most of its history, the second village in Ockbrook parish and sits on the eastern edge of Derby city. In the late 1800s it started to grow and now it is the larger of the two villages. The Derby Canal arrived in Borrowash in 1796, but it gradually fell into decline after the introduction of the railway during mid nineteenth century; and by the 1960s it was abandoned. Passenger rail service ceased in 1966 and the Borrowash railway station was demolished in 1994. Borrowash is part of the parish of Ockbrook, but has its own church, St Stephen's Church, Borrowash, which was built in 1899 by P.H.Currey of Derby who designed many fine buildings in the county.

Sport

Football
The local football team Borrowash Victoria A.F.C. was founded in 1911. They are currently members of the East Midlands Counties League and play at the Asterdale Bowl. The club originated in Borrowash before relocating to Spondon in 1984. The ground is situated next door to Graham Street Prims.

Cricket
History of cricket dates back to the mid nineteenth century, where a match report was recorded between Ockbrook and "Sawley Club" in 1843. Ockbrook & Borrowash Cricket Club moved to the current ground on Victoria Avenue in 1898. In 1999, Ockbrook & Borrowash CC became the first champions of the newly formed The Premier Division of the Derbyshire County Cricket League; the top level for recreational club cricket in Derbyshire, England, and is a designated ECB Premier League. The club has continued to gain high acclaim and has since added a further 5 Championship league titles to its tally: 2005, 2006, 2009, 2011, and 2014.

Tennis
Ockbrook & Borrowash Lawn Tennis Club was established after the First World War in 1919, providing a recreation facility for soldiers arriving back from the War. Located in Nottingham Road, the club has five outdoor carpet courts.

Education
Borrowash Playgroup offers non-compulsory education to children aged between one and three, as does Ashbrook Nursery School but this is specifically for ages two to four. Ashbrook Infant and Junior Schools provide compulsory education at Key Stages 1 and 2 for children aged 4–11.

For further educational facilities (non-fee paying), the closest secondary school is West Park in Spondon where, as of 2004, a sixth form no longer exists and consequently the closest provider of further education is Friesland School in Sandiacre. The nearest university is the University of Derby.

Transportation
There are three bus routes which serve Borrowash.
Littles Travel operate services 9/9A into Derby City Centre under tender to Derby City Council. Trent Barton also operate Indigo and i4 buses serving the village towards both Nottingham and Derby city centres at frequent intervals.

To the south of the village there was once a railway station (Borrowash railway station opened by the Midland Counties Railway) and the Derby Canal with two locks.  The train station was built in 1839 and closed in 1966, But the train platform still served as stopping point in Borrowash to passengers until 1978, Then platform was completely removed. The canal is currently being restored, with the work on one of the locks nearing completion. The area which the canal used to run through is currently a public footpath linking Borrowash and Spondon.

Route 6 on the National Cycle network also connects Borrowash to Derby via a riverside path, which runs along the route of the canal to Elvaston then parallel to this for the duration of the journey.

See also
Listed buildings in Ockbrook and Borrowash
Borrowash Hydro

References

External links
 Borrowash Area Community Website Community Website Serving Borrowash

Villages in Derbyshire
Civil parishes in Derbyshire
Borough of Erewash